Pierre Cauchon (1371 – 18 December 1442) was Bishop of Beauvais from 1420 to 1432. He was a strong partisan of English interests in France during the latter years of the Hundred Years' War. He was the judge in the trial of Joan of Arc and played a key role in her execution. The Catholic Church overturned his verdict in 1456.

Background
Cauchon came from a middle-class family in Rheims. He entered the clergy as a teenager and went to Paris, where he studied at the University of Paris. Cauchon was a brilliant student in the liberal arts. He followed with studies in canon law and theology and became a priest.

Early career
By 1404, Cauchon was curé of Égliselles and sought a post near Rheims. He defended the University of Paris in a quarrel against Toulouse. Cauchon sought advancement through noble patronage. He allied himself with Duke John the Fearless of Burgundy and later his successor, Philip the Good.

In 1407, Cauchon was part of a mission from the crown of France to attempt to reconcile the Schism between the rival claimants to the papacy: Boniface IX and Gregory XII. Although the delegation failed to achieve its goal, it raised Cauchon's prestige as a negotiator.

Upon Cauchon's return, he found Paris in turmoil over the assassination of the Duke of Orléans under orders from John the Fearless. Many suspected that the duke had been having an affair with Queen Isabeau. University theologians sympathized with John and published a justification of the assassination as tyrannicide by arguing that the Duke of Orléans had been planning to usurp the throne.

It is also known that Cauchon had been the dean of the University of Paris, where he had studied, and that, by 1423, he became Henry VI of England's personal counsellor.

The choice of the Burgundian party
The French Estates-General opened in 1413 to raise funds for an expected war against the English. Cauchon formed part of a commission charged with proposing sanctions and reforms. During the riots of that year he was associated with the Burgundians and the Cabochiens (radical reformers) and was later banished from Paris on May 14, 1414. The next year, Cauchon became the official ambassador of the Duke of Burgundy.  Bishop Cauchon supported the election of Pope Martin V. Shortly afterward, Cauchon became archdeacon of Chartres; canon of Rheims, Châlons, and Beauvais; and chaplain of the Duke of Burgundy. Cauchon took part in the royal marriage negotiations surrounding the Treaty of Troyes. He became Bishop of Beauvais in 1420.

Alliance with the English
Bishop Cauchon spent most of the next two years in service to the king. He returned to his diocese with the deaths of Charles VI and Henry V. He departed for a visit to Rheims in 1429 when Joan of Arc and the French army approached for the coronation of Charles VII. Cauchon had always allied with the opposition to Charles VII.  Shortly after the coronation, the French army threatened Cauchon's diocese. He went to Rouen, seat of the English government in France.

The English regent, the Duke of Bedford, was anxious to preserve the claim of his nephew and charge Henry VI of England, grandson of Charles VI and nephew of Charles VII, to the throne of France, as per the Treaty of Troyes. Cauchon escorted Henry from London to Rouen as part of a clerical delegation. Shortly after he returned, he learned that Joan of Arc had been taken captive near Compiègne. The Burgundians held her at the keep of Beaulieu near Saint-Quentin.

Cauchon played a leading role in negotiations to gain Joan of Arc from the Burgundians for the English. He was well paid for his efforts. Cauchon claimed jurisdiction to try her case because Compiègne was in his diocese of Beauvais.

The trial of Joan of Arc

The goal of Joan of Arc's trial was to discredit her, and by implication to discredit the king she had crowned. Cauchon organized events carefully with a number of ecclesiastics, many of whom came from the pro-English University of Paris. The trial opened on 21 February 1431. Concerned for the regularity of the proceeding, Bishop Cauchon forwarded an  bill of indictment to Paris in order to obtain the opinion of university clerics, who agreed with the charges. In the meantime, the trial continued. Joan was unwilling to testify on several subjects. The court considered torturing her.  The court proceeded to official admonition on the field of the abbey of Saint-Ouen. As Cauchon read her sentence of condemnation, she agreed to abjure. Shortly afterward she recanted and was burned at the stake on 30 May 1431.

New appointment
Cauchon could not hope to go back to Beauvais, which had fallen under French control. He was interested in a vacancy at the archbishop's palace at Rouen. Facing heartfelt opposition, he gave up that project. In December, Cauchon accompanied the Cardinal of Winchester to crown young king Henry VI in Paris. Finally, he obtained an appointment as Bishop of Lisieux (29 January 1432 – 15 December 1442).

When constable Arthur de Richemont returned to favour with Charles VII of France in 1436, Cauchon went as ambassador to the Council of Basel. He was active for the unsuccessful English side in the peace negotiations that ended in reconciliation between the French and the Burgundians.

Cauchon divided his later years between his new diocese and a residence in Rouen. His last action was to finance construction of a vault at the cathedral Saint-Pierre de Lisieux. Cauchon died abruptly of heart failure at the age of 71 on 15 December 1442 in Rouen. He was buried in Lisieux Cathedral beneath the vault he had patronised. There is not any marking that indicates the exact location of his burial site, but his skeleton was re-discovered during a renovation of the pavement of the vault in 1931. When the renovation works were finished, no markings were added.

According to George Bernard Shaw in his 1923 play Saint Joan, Cauchon's body was later dug up and thrown into a sewer; in fact it was Jean d'Estivet, one of the promoters of the trial, who was found dead in a sewer.

See also
Inquisition
Middle Ages
History of France

References

External links

Bishops of Beauvais
Bishops of Lisieux
15th-century French Roman Catholic bishops
People of the Hundred Years' War
1371 births
1442 deaths
Clergy from Reims
15th-century peers of France
People excommunicated by the Catholic Church